Gianfranco Bortolotti (born 2 May 1959) is an Italian electronic music producer and manager of Media Records and Media Studio. He was a member of Cappella, and 49ers who had several hits, and Fits of Gloom, who had a UK No. 47 hit with "Heaven" and a UK No. 49 hit with "The Power of Love" featuring Lizzy Mack. In the United States, he scored a No. 1  single on Billboard's Dance Club Songs chart with "Deep in My Heart" as a member of the group Clubhouse in 1991.

Originally becoming a DJ to supplement his university days, he helped distribute records for DJ Pierre and after scoring a few minor hits, re-invested money back into Media Records. The success of Media enabled him to invest in at least ten different studios, producing hits at a sweatshop pace.

References

Italian record producers
Living people
Italian house musicians
1959 births